Matthews Glacier is a glacier on the east side of the Wilkins Mountains, Antarctica, draining south to enter the Ronne Ice Shelf just west of Dodson Peninsula. It was mapped by the United States Geological Survey from surveys and U.S. Navy air photos, 1961–67, and was named by the Advisory Committee on Antarctic Names for J.D. Matthews, an engineman at South Pole Station in 1963.

References

Glaciers of Palmer Land
Filchner-Ronne Ice Shelf